Patrice Bret (born 1971) is a French ski mountaineer. He was born in Lyon.

Selected results 
 1997:
 5th, French Championship
 5th, French Cup
 1998:
 2nd, French Championship
 3rd, French Cup
 4th, European Cup
 1999 :
 1st, French Championship team (together with Stéphane Brosse)
 6th, European Championship team race (together with Stéphane Brosse)
 2000:
 1st, European Cup team (together with Stéphane Brosse)
 2001:
 1st, Croix de Chamrousse
 3rd, European Cup
 5th, European Championship team race (together with Olivier Pasteur)

Pierra Menta 

 1997: 10th, together with Stéphane Brosse
 1998: 7th, together with Stéphane Brosse
 1999: 3rd, together with Stéphane Brosse
 2000: 3rd, together with Stéphane Brosse

References 

1971 births
Living people
French male ski mountaineers
Sportspeople from Lyon